Alfred Bates (8 June 1944 – 17 December 2013) was a British Labour Party politician.

Having unsuccessfully fought Northwich in 1970, Bates was first elected to the House of Commons in the February 1974 general election, as Member of Parliament for Bebington and Ellesmere Port.  He was re-elected at the October 1974 election, but lost his seat at the 1979 general election to the Conservative Barry Porter by 486 votes (a margin of just 0.7%).  Bates served as a government whip between 1976 and 1979.

Notes

References
Times Guide to the House of Commons 1979

1944 births
2013 deaths
Labour Party (UK) MPs for English constituencies
UK MPs 1974
UK MPs 1974–1979